Rani Jeyraj is an Indian model and winner of Miss India in 1996. A native of Kundal village in Tirunelveli District, she was born to a middle class Christian Nadar family in Zambia. Her parents were teachers in Zambia 

She attended secondary education at Bishop Cotton Girls' School, passing ISC Examination with distinction.

References

Female models from Tamil Nadu
Femina Miss India winners
Living people
Year of birth missing (living people)
People from Kanyakumari district
Miss World 1996 delegates